Kristine Lora Quance (born April 1, 1975), also known by her married name Kristine Julian, is an American former competition swimmer who specialized in breaststroke and medley events.  Quance competed at the international level in the 1990s, and swam at the 1996 Summer Olympics in Atlanta, Georgia, winning a gold medal in the 4×100-meter medley relay.  She is a 10-time United States national champion; and twice won the Kiphuth Award for highest individual point scorer at an individual national championship (one of these in the Summer of 1992 when she won all four events she swam in).

Pre-1996
While training with Bud McAlister at CLASS Aquatics in her hometown of Northridge, Quance was selected to make her international debut at the 1991 Pan Pacific Swimming Championships in Edmonton, Canada, where she won gold and silver in the 200-meter breaststroke and 400-meter individual medley respectively. 1992 was a disappointment for Quance, as she missed selection for the 1992 Summer Olympics in Barcelona, Spain. She made a strong comeback at the 1993 Pan Pacs in Kobe, Japan, winning gold and bronze in the 400-meter individual medley and 200-meter breaststroke respectively. 1994 yielded her first medal at the global level, winning a bronze in the 400-meter individual medley and finishing sixth in the 200-meter breaststroke at the 1994 World Aquatics Championships in Rome, Italy.

1996
1996 proved a critical year for Quance. At the 1996 US Olympic Trials in March, she was disqualified in her two best events (the 200 breaststroke and 400-meter individual medley), but instead qualified for the 1996 Summer Olympics in Atlanta in the 100-meter breaststroke and 200-meter individual medley. At the Games, she finishing 9th and 19th respectively in the 200-meter individual medley and 100-meter breaststroke. However, she collected a gold medal in the 4×100-meter medley relay by swimming the breaststroke leg in the heats (Amanda Beard swam in the final).

She was a two-time recipient of the Honda Sports Award for Swimming and Diving, recognizing her as the outstanding college female swimmer of the year in 1995–96 and again in 1996–97.  She also received Swimmer of the Year honors at the 1996 NCAA Women's Division I Swimming & Diving Championships.

Post 1996
Quance bounced back again at the 1997 Pan Pacific Championships in Fukuoka, Japan, winning the 200-meter and 400-meter individual medley events, finishing second in the 200-meter butterfly and fourth in the 200-meter breaststroke.  This earned her the American Swimmer of the Year award from Swimming World Magazine.

The 1998 World Championships in Perth, Australia marked her last international appearance.  There she made the finals in the 200-meter butterfly and 200-meter individual medley.  She also became the fifth American woman to qualify for four individual events on a World Championship team.  Previously this had been done by Janet Evans (1991), Cynthia Woodhead (1978), Tracy Caulkins (1978), and Shirley Babashoff (1975).

Post swimmer
She now coaches young swimmers at the Rose Bowl Aquatics Center in Pasadena, CA with her husband, Jeff Julian (also a former world-class swimmer). They also have a son named Trenton Julian, who also swims at the Rose Bowl Aquatics Center.

See also
 List of Olympic medalists in swimming (women)
 List of World Aquatics Championships medalists in swimming (women)

References

External links
 

1975 births
Living people
American female breaststroke swimmers
American female butterfly swimmers
American female medley swimmers
Olympic gold medalists for the United States in swimming
People from Northridge, Los Angeles
Swimmers at the 1996 Summer Olympics
World Aquatics Championships medalists in swimming
Medalists at the 1996 Summer Olympics
20th-century American women
USC Trojans women's swimmers